The 2020 USA Swimming Olympic trials was held at CHI Health Center Omaha in Omaha, Nebraska, for a fourth consecutive time. Originally scheduled from June 21 to 28, 2020, it was rescheduled to June 4 to 7, 2021, (wave I) and June 13 to 20, 2021, (wave II) due to the COVID-19 pandemic resulting in the postponement of the 2020 Summer Olympics to 2021. The meet served as the national championships in swimming for the United States. Those qualifying competed for the United States in swimming at the 2020 Summer Olympics in Tokyo, Japan.

Qualification criteria
A maximum of 52 swimmers (26 of each sex, not including open water swimmers) were chosen for the 2020 Summer Olympics from Wave II.  To make the Olympic team, a swimmer must place in the top two in one of the fourteen individual events.  To be considered for the U.S. 4×100-meter and 4×200-meter freestyle relay teams, a swimmer must place in the top six in the 100-meter and 200-meter freestyle, respectively.  Swimmers must have achieved a time standard to be eligible to compete in the U.S. Olympic trials:

 Information retrieved from USA Swimming.

Two wave structure
In January 2021, USA Swimming announced its decision to break the Olympic trials into two meets called waves. This decision was made in part to follow social distancing protocols and keep attendees, athletes, and workers safer during the COVID-19 pandemic. Each wave had a different set of qualification time standards. The time standards took effect January 28, 2021 and an initial qualifying period for both waves ended May 30, 2021. Wave I swimmers who met the time standards for Wave II at the Wave I meet and finished first or second in their event qualified to compete at the Wave II meet. Finals for Wave I were conducted in an A-final and B-final format.

A total of 50 swimmers from Wave I qualified to compete in Wave II. The first swimmer who swam in the Wave I meet and advanced to a second swim, semifinal or final, at the Wave II meet was Heather MacCausland in the women's 100-meter breaststroke on June 14, 2021. The most watched YouTube video from the entire Olympic trials came from Wave I not Wave II. It was a clip of Kayla Han winning the B-final of the women's 400-meter individual medley and breaking a USA Swimming national age group record in the process.

Between Wave I and Wave II, 2,285 individuals competed at the 2020 Olympic trials, a decrease of over 700 swimmers from the 2016 Olympic trials. As a whole, proportionally fewer Wave I swimmers and proportionally more Wave II swimmers swam faster than their seed times compared to swimmers at the 2016 Olympic trials.

Events
The meet featured twenty-eight individual events in a long course (50-meter) pool—fourteen events for men and fourteen events for women.  Events 200 meters and shorter were held with preliminaries, semifinals and finals, while events 400 meters and longer were held with preliminaries and finals.  Semifinals featured sixteen swimmers in two heats; the finals included eight swimmers in a single heat.  Preliminaries were seeded with ten lanes.  Event order, which mimicked that of the 2020 Olympics, with the exception of the Olympic relay events, were the following for Wave II:

U.S. Olympic Team
The following swimmers qualified to compete at the 2020 Summer Olympics (for pool events):

Men
Michael Andrew, Zach Apple, Hunter Armstrong, Bowe Becker, Gunnar Bentz, Michael Brinegar, Patrick Callan, Brooks Curry, Caeleb Dressel, Nic Fink, Bobby Finke, Townley Haas, Zach Harting, Chase Kalisz, Drew Kibler, Jay Litherland, Bryce Mefford, Jake Mitchell, Ryan Murphy, Blake Pieroni, Andrew Seliskar, Tom Shields, Kieran Smith, Andrew Wilson.

Women
Phoebe Bacon, Erika Brown, Claire Curzan, Catie DeLoof, Kate Douglass, Hali Flickinger, Brooke Forde, Katie Grimes, Natalie Hinds, Torri Huske, Lydia Jacoby, Lilly King, Annie Lazor, Katie Ledecky, Paige Madden, Simone Manuel, Katie McLaughlin, Allison Schmitt, Bella Sims, Regan Smith, Olivia Smoliga, Erica Sullivan, Alex Walsh, Abbey Weitzeil, Emma Weyant, Rhyan White.

U.S. Olympic Team members in open water swimming events:

Men
Jordan Wilimovsky.

Women
Haley Anderson, Ashley Twichell.

Results 
Key:

Men's events

Women's events

Olympics freestyle relay qualifiers
Key:

Men

Women

Television coverage and viewership
Two national television networks covered the US Olympic trials in swimming in the United States, NBC and NBCSN. NBCSN aired the heats later the same day and NBC aired the finals and some of the semifinals same day. This coverage was part of the NBC Olympics television and digital programming covering the U.S. Olympic Team trials in various sports that set a new record in number of hours of coverage of the Olympic trials for all sports in the United States at 85.25 hours.

Sunday coverage of the U.S. Olympic Team trials in swimming on NBC made it into the top 20 most viewed programs for the day. For the top five most viewed days of U.S. Olympic Team trials across all sports, the swimming team trials had one day make it in the top five along with two days from team trials in track and field and two days from gymnastics team trials.

References

External links 

Official website of the 2020 U.S. Olympic Trials (swimming)
Results book – Wave I
Results book – Wave II

Swimming Olympic trials
Olympic Trails swimming
United States
Sports in Omaha, Nebraska
United States
United States Summer Olympics Trials
United States Olympic trials
United States Olympic trials, 2020 swimming
United States Olympic trials, 2020 swimming